The 1967–68 AHL season was the 32nd season of the American Hockey League. Eight teams played 72 games each in the schedule. The league played a limited interlocking schedule with the Western Hockey League which was a repeat of the experiment two seasons earlier.  The Louis A. R. Pieri Memorial Award is first awarded to the "outstanding coach" in the league's regular season. The Rochester Americans finished first overall in the regular season, and won their third Calder Cup championship in four years.

Team changes
 The Pittsburgh Hornets cease operations, when the Pittsburgh Penguins join the National Hockey League as an expansion team.
 The Quebec Aces switch divisions from East to West.
 The Springfield Indians are renamed the Springfield Kings.

Final standings
Note: GP = Games played; W = Wins; L = Losses; T = Ties; GF = Goals for; GA = Goals against; Pts = Points;

Scoring leaders

Note: GP = Games played; G = Goals; A = Assists; Pts = Points; PIM = Penalty minutes

 complete list

Calder Cup playoffs
First round
Rochester Americans defeated Hershey Bears 4 games to 1.
Providence Reds defeated Springfield Kings 3 games to 1.
Quebec Aces defeated Buffalo Bisons 3 games to 2.
Second round
Rochester Americans earned second round bye.
Quebec Aces defeated Providence Reds 3 games to 1.  
Finals
Rochester Americans defeated Quebec Aces 4 games to 2, to win the Calder Cup. 
 list of scores

Trophy and award winners
Team awards

Individual awards

Other awards

See also
List of AHL seasons

References
AHL official site
AHL Hall of Fame
HockeyDB

American Hockey League seasons
2
2